is a Tendai Buddhist temple of Japan, located in Yanaka, Taitō, Tokyo.

The temple was erected by Nichigen in 1274.

See also
Yanaka Cemetery

References

Tendai temples
Buddhist temples in Tokyo